The J platform was a designation used for two  automobile platforms from Chrysler Corporation in the 1980s.

The first was a rear-wheel drive platform, in production from 1980. It was very similar to the 4-door Chrysler F platform and Chrysler M platform, which were based on the Chrysler A platform.

The J platform was only used for coupés between 1980 and 1983:
 1980-1983 Chrysler Cordoba
 1980-1983 Dodge Mirada
 1981-1983 Imperial

A second, unrelated, J platform, was a variant of the front-wheel drive K platform produced between 1987 and 1995, which made its debut with the introduction of the newly redesigned Chrysler LeBaron coupe and convertible. 

J